The 2015 Lamar Hunt U.S. Open Cup was the 102nd edition of the oldest ongoing competition in American soccer.

The tournament had teams from all three tiers of men's professional soccer, plus teams from the top amateur leagues in the United States. Qualification began in 2014 with USASA regional winners qualifying for 2015. The tournament retained a format that had only two changes from 2014. For the first time, the competition used a fixed bracket system starting with the Round of 16. Teams were grouped geographically into groups of four teams, with each group being paired with another to determine the semifinal pairings. Secondly, a rule was formalized preventing teams from the same ownership group from meeting until the final.

The cash prize amounts were the same as last year, with the champion receiving $250,000 and the runner-up $60,000. Also, the team from each lower division that advanced the furthest received $15,000. The teams that received $15,000 were: (a) PSA Elite an amateur team that advanced to the 4th round where they lost to the LA Galaxy; (b) the Charlotte Independence of the USL advanced to the 5th round where they lost to the Chicago Fire; and (c) New York Cosmos of the NASL which also advanced to the 5th round before losing to the New York Red Bulls.

Qualification 

All United States Division I (MLS), Division II (NASL), & Division III (USL) teams qualify automatically.

 $: Winner of $15,000 bonus for advancing the furthest in the competition from their respective divisions.
 $$: Winner of $60,000 for being the runner-up in the competition.
 $$$: Winner of $250,000 for winning the competition.

Brackets 
Host team listed firstBold = winner* = after extra time, = penalty shootout score

Entries

Match Details

Preliminary round 
The Preliminary round draw was announced Wednesday, April 8, 2015. A total of 4 clubs competed, all amateur clubs from the fourth tier of American soccer.

First round 
The first round draw was announced Wednesday, April 8, 2015. A total of 42 clubs competed, including the 2 winners from the preliminary round and 40 new entries from the 4th and 5th tiers.

Second round 
The second round draw was announced on Wednesday, April 8, 2015. A total of 42 teams competed, including the 21 winners from the previous round and 21 new entries from the third tier United Soccer League. The lowest ranked teams this round are Harpo's FC, PSA Elite and Chula Vista FC from the fifth tier.

Third round 
The third round draw was held on May 14. A total of 30 teams competed, including the 21 winners from the previous round and 9 new entries from the second tier North American Soccer League. The lowest ranked teams this round are PSA Elite and Chula Vista FC from the fifth tier. Among the notable results: In all seven matchups between the third-tier USL and second-tier NASL, the USL clubs were victorious.

Fourth round 
The fourth round draw was held on May 21. A total of 32 teams will compete, including the 15 winners from the previous round and 17 new entries from top flight Major League Soccer. The lowest ranked team this round is PSA Elite from the fifth tier.

Round of 16 
The draw for the fifth round, which took place June 18, placed clubs into four 4-team regions. Clubs from different regions could not be drawn against one another. The lowest ranked team remaining is the Charlotte Independence of the third-tier United Soccer League.

Quarterfinals 
All eight quarterfinal teams come from Major League Soccer, the top tier of professional soccer in the United States.

Semifinals

Final

Top Goalscorers 
Players and teams still active in bold.

References

External links 
 The Cup.us – Full Coverage of the US Open Cup

 
U.S. Open Cup
U.S. Open Cup